"Red Bandana" is a song written and recorded by American country music artist Merle Haggard.  It was released in March 1979 as the first single from the album Serving 190 Proof.  The song reached #4 on the Billboard Hot Country Singles & Tracks chart.

Content
The narrator states that he can't grow up and settle down but he can appreciate the way she looks when she has a red bandana tied around her hair.  The lyrics make reference to Kris Kristofferson's "Me and Bobby McGee".

Charts

Weekly charts

Year-end charts

References

1979 singles
1979 songs
Merle Haggard songs
Songs written by Merle Haggard
Song recordings produced by Jimmy Bowen
MCA Records singles